Eriopyrrha is a genus of moths of the family Yponomeutidae.

Species
Eriopyrrha colabristis - Meyrick, 1907 

Yponomeutidae